Mick Clohisey (born 13 January 1986) is an Irish marathon runner.

In 2014, he won the Vienna City Half Marathon and the 2014 Irish national cross country title.

In 2016, he finished 32nd in the men's half marathon at the 2016 European Athletics Championships.

Clohisey was selected to represent Ireland at the 2016 Olympics, and finished 103rd in the marathon. He finished 22nd at the 2017 World Championships.

He runs for the Raheny Shamrocks, and won the Belfast Marathon in 2021.

References

Living people
Athletes from the Republic of Ireland
Irish male long-distance runners
Olympic athletes of Ireland
Athletes (track and field) at the 2016 Summer Olympics
1986 births
Irish male marathon runners
People educated at St Paul's College, Raheny